Poon Chi-fai, JP (born 6 December 1951, Hong Kong) was the member of the Legislative Council of Hong Kong and Kwun Tong District Board.

Poon was born and raised in Hong Kong. He studied economics at the North Carolina A&T State University before he returned and worked in Hong Kong in 1978. He had worked for the Kowloon Motor Bus Ltd. as public relations consultant. He began to participate in community services in 1979 by working in the area committees in Kwun Tong district. He was subsequently appointed to the Kwun Tong District Board in 1985 and elected to the Legislative Council in the first indirect election in 1985 through Kwun Tong electoral college constituency consisting of members of the Kwun Tong District Board and reelected in 1988.

He had served on the Standing Commission on Civil Service Salaries and Conditions of Service and the Citizen Advisory Committee on Community Relations of the Independent Commission Against Corruption (ICAC).

He ran for re-election in the first direct election 1991 but was defeated by the pro-democracy activists Szeto Wah and Fred Li of the United Democrats of Hong Kong and Meeting Point alliance.

References

1951 births
Living people
District councillors of Kwun Tong District
Virginia Tech alumni
North Carolina A&T State University alumni
Progressive Hong Kong Society politicians
HK LegCo Members 1985–1988
HK LegCo Members 1988–1991